This is a list of educational institutions in Cagayan de Oro, Philippines.

Elementary and Grade School
This is a list of Public and Private Elementary and Grade Schools in Cagayan de Oro.

Public Elementary Schools
The Department of Education - Division of Cagayan de Oro has 9 districts.

Central District
City Central SchoolYacapin-Velez Sts., Cagayan de Oro
Corrales Elementary School Corrales Ave., Cagayan de Oro

East District I

East District II

North District I

North District II

South District

Southwest District

West District I

West District II

Private Elementary Schools
This following is the list of Private Elementary Schools in Cagayan de Oro.

High school
This is a list of Public and Private High Schools in Cagayan de Oro.

Public High Schools
The following is a list of Public High Schools in Cagayan de Oro.

SUPREME STUDENT GOVERNMENT HISTORY
The Student Government Program (SGP) is the Philippines' program for pupil governments in elementary schools & student governments in secondary schools of the Department of Education, under the Office of the Undersecretary for Regional Operations. It is the foremost co-curricular student organization authorized to implement pertinent programs, projects, and activities in Philippine schools as mandated by the Department of Education.

The Philippines has a complex student union with different names such as student government, the term used in all public secondary schools and some of the universities and/or colleges and student council for most of the colleges/universities.

The Center for Students and Co-Curricular Affairs (CSCA) was established in 1996 in order to further facilitate co-curricular work of student councils in the country and mold them to be better leaders.
In 2003, the Supreme Student Governments were institutionalized starting with the establishment of the National Federation of Supreme Student Governments (NFSSG) with David Maulas of Bohol as its first National Federation President elected during the 1st National Leadership Training for Student Government Officers (NLTSGO). An institutionalized Constitution and By Laws of the Supreme Student Governments were enforced through a Department Order No. 43, s. 2005, then revised in 2009 as per Department Order No. 79, s. 2009. The second National Federation officers were elected September 2012 with Raja Barber of Oriental Mindoro as the 2nd National Federation President.
In 2019 as per Department Order No. 85, s. 2019. The final las set of National Federation officers were elected August 2019 with Jericho Ryan Chiong of Cagayan de Oro Misamis Oriental o as the last National Federation President.

In 2014, through Department Order No. 47, s. 2014 the Constitution and By-Laws of Supreme Pupil Governments in elementary schools and Supreme Student Governments in secondary schools around the country were unified. This marks the year where the Supreme Pupil Governments are institutionalized.
Currently the program is now under the Office of the Undersecretary for Regional Operations.

NATIONAL FEDERATION PRESIDENTS

Division Federated Supreme Student Government Officers
The following are the list of Public High Schools DFSSG officers in Cagayan de Oro.

SY 2019-2021

Science High Schools 
The following is a list of science high schools in Cagayan de Oro.

Gusa Regional Science High School - XJ.R. Borja Ext., Gusa, Cagayan de Oro

Private High Schools
The following is a list of private high schools in Cagayan de Oro.

ASSOCIATION OF PRIVATE SECONDARY SCHOOLS IN CAGAYAN DE ORO & MISAMIS ORIENTAL HISTORY

The Association of Private Secondary Schools in Cagayan de Oro and Misamis Oriental – Federation of Student Governments, is the union of Private Secondary Student Governments in Cagayan de Oro and the province of Misamis Oriental.  APSSCOMOR-FSG traced its roots due to the call of four(4) different student governments: Merry Child School, Little Me Academy, Millenium Christian Academy, and Liceo de Cagayan University Junior High School, who saw the need for the Private Secondary Student Governments to unite in a cause of collaboration to advance their ideals on the empowerment of Students.

With the help and guidance of the Association of Private Secondary Schools in Cagayan de Oro and Misamis Oriental (APSSCOMOR), the organization of Private Secondary School Administrators, the Student Governments from different Private Institutions converged in an event, thus created the APSSCOMOR-FSG and elected its first officers under the leadership of Mr. Kyle Chester J. Cotacte, who also led the four student governments that called for the creation of the federation. During its first year, with the guidance of Mr. Jessie Andallasa, the FSG's Moderator and Member of the APSSCOMOR Board, the federation sought out to connect with its member student governments.  The prime achievement also of the first administration of the federation was earning a seat in the Oro Youth Development Council (OYDC) - the Highest Policy Recommending Body on youth affairs in Cagayan de Oro. It enables the federation to participate in lobbying policies such as the Oro Youth Code of 2018 and the Students Rights and Welfare Ordinance (STRAW Ordinance) which the latter being proposed in the city council by the OYDC.

Association of Private Secondary Schools In Cagayan de Oro & Misamis Oriental-Federation of Student Governments
The following are the list of Private High Schools APSCOMMOR-FSG officers in Cagayan de Oro & Misamis Oriental.

Notes

Cagayan de Oro
Schools in Cagayan de Oro